Strahojadica is a village in the municipality of Zelenikovo, North Macedonia.

Demographics
As of the 2021 census, Strahojadica had 735 residents with the following ethnic composition:
Macedonians 281
Albanians 225
Bosniaks 182
Persons for whom data are taken from administrative sources 43
Others 4

According to the 2002 census, the village had a total of 268 inhabitants. Ethnic groups in the village include:
Albanians 267 
Macedonians 1

References

External links

Villages in Zelenikovo Municipality
Albanian communities in North Macedonia